The Spanish mystics are major figures in the Catholic Reformation of 16th and 17th century Spain.  The goal of this movement was to reform the Church structurally and to renew it spiritually.  The Spanish Mystics attempted to express in words their experience of a mystical communion with Christ.

Language and writing style 
These writers had a strong influence on the development of the Spanish Language and were said to have ushered in the "Golden Age of Spanish Literature."  At the beginning of the time period, the language was viewed as coarse; by the end, the language had achieved what is called "the high baroque style of Spanish," which in certain forms (especially in formal letter-writing) continues to influence Spanish usage to the present.

In addition to being examples of Christian holiness and major Spanish literary figures, the Spanish Mystics were also real reformers in the Church.  Their writings inspired a religious quest for God based on desire rather than obligation and medieval legalism, and three of them went on to found or reform religious orders that would carry on their work across continents and centuries.

Principal figures and their major writings 
Teresa de Cartagena, (writer)
Grove of the Infirm
Wonder at the Works of God
St. Teresa of Ávila, O.C.D.
The Interior Castle
The Way of Perfection
St. John of the Cross, O.C.D. (poet)
Dark Night of the Soul
Ascent of Mount Carmel
St. Ignatius of Loyola, S.J.
The Spiritual Exercises
Autobiography
St. Francis de Borja, S.J.
Luis de León, O.E.S.A. (poet)
Venerable Mary of Jesus of Ágreda, O.I.C. (writer)
Mystical City of God
Fernando de Herrera (poet)
Blessed Ramon Lull, T.O.S.F. (philosopher)

Other Spanish mystics
 Bernardo de Hoyos
 María Rafols Bruna

References

Counter-Reformation
Catholic Church in Spain